Idun Peak is a small peak between Mount Thundergut and Veli Peak in the Asgard Range of Victoria Land, Antarctica. The name, recommended by the Advisory Committee on Antarctic Names in consultation with the New Zealand Antarctic Place-Names Committee, is one in a group of names in the Asgard Range derived from Norse mythology, Idun (Iðunn) being a Norse goddess.

References

Mountains of the Asgard Range
McMurdo Dry Valleys